Davidsburg is an unincorporated community in York County, Pennsylvania, United States. Davidsburg is located in Dover Township, 3 miles west of Weigelstown.

References

Unincorporated communities in York County, Pennsylvania
Unincorporated communities in Pennsylvania